Acuphis tetrapennatus is a species of mite in the family Ologamasidae.
It was described in 2006 from specimens found in Ecuador and living in soil.

References

Ologamasidae
Animals described in 2006
Taxa named by Wolfgang Karg